Beth Paxson (born February 10, 1960) is an American cross-country skier. She competed in three events at the 1980 Winter Olympics. Paxson also skied at the University of Vermont, where she is a 1984 graduate.

Cross-country skiing results

Olympic Games

World Championships

References

External links
 

1960 births
Living people
American female cross-country skiers
Olympic cross-country skiers of the United States
Cross-country skiers at the 1980 Winter Olympics
Sportspeople from Burlington, Vermont
University of Vermont alumni
Vermont Catamounts skiers
20th-century American women